The 2018–19 Northern Iowa Panthers men's basketball team represented the University of Northern Iowa during the 2018–19 NCAA Division I men's basketball season. The Panthers, led by 13th-year head coach Ben Jacobson, played their home games at the McLeod Center in Cedar Falls, Iowa as members of the Missouri Valley Conference. They finished the season 16–18, 9–9 in MVC play to finish in a three-way tie for fifth place. As the No. 6 seed in the MVC tournament, they beat Southern Illinois and Drake before losing to Bradley in the championship.

Previous season
The Panthers finished the 2017–18 season 16–16, 7–11 in MVC play to finish three-way tie for seventh place. As the No. 7 seed in the MVC tournament, they defeated Evansville in the first round before losing to Loyola–Chicago in the quarterfinals.

Offseason

Departures

Incoming transfers

2018 recruiting class

2019 recruiting class

2020 recruiting class

Roster

Schedule and results

|-
!colspan=9 style=|Exhibition

|-
!colspan=9 style=| Non-conference regular season

|-
!colspan=9 style=| Missouri Valley Conference regular season

|-
!colspan=9 style=| Missouri Valley tournament

Source

Panther Sports Network (PSN) Cedar Falls Utilities Ch. 15/HD415; KCRG-TV Ch. 9.2; WHO-DT Ch. 13.2; KGCW Ch. 26, (NBC Sports Chicago or NBCSC+)

References

Northern Iowa Panthers men's basketball seasons
Northern Iowa
Panth
Panth